Upcott may refer to:

Surnames of persons
 Arthur William Upcott, DD, MA (6 January 1857 – 22 May 1922) was an Anglican priest and educationalist.
 Edward Upcott (29 December 1991) is a five times British acrobatic gymnast
 Rosemary Firth (née Upcott) (1912 – 9 July 2001) was a British social anthropologist
 William Upcott (1779–1845) was an English librarian and antiquary.

Places
Upcott, Almeley, a farm, hamlet and historic manor in Herefordshire, England
Upcott, Cheriton Fitzpaine, an historic estate in Devon, England